Monroe Catholic High School is a private, Roman Catholic high school in Fairbanks, Alaska.  It is the only Catholic high school in the Roman Catholic Diocese of Fairbanks.  It is the northernmost Roman Catholic high school in the Americas.

Background
Monroe High School, as it was known at that time, was founded in 1955.  For the first academic year, classes were held in the Immaculate Conception Church basement for the nine freshman students.  The next year, another class was added when the new modern school building was opened adjacent to the grade school.  Each year another class was added until the class of 1959, comprising six by that time, graduated.

Notable alumni
 Suzanne Jackson, visual artist, poet, dancer
 Mike Kelly, Alaska politician
 Pete Kelly, Alaska politician
 Lisa Murkowski, U.S. Senator
 Kirsten Powers, journalist
 Stephen Sundborg, Jesuit priest, president of Seattle University

External links
 School website

References

1955 establishments in Alaska
Educational institutions established in 1955
Catholic secondary schools in Alaska
Jesuit high schools in the United States
Schools accredited by the Northwest Accreditation Commission
Schools in Fairbanks, Alaska
Roman Catholic Diocese of Fairbanks